Thesprotia is a genus of mantises commonly known as grass mantis.  They are native to the Americas and are represented by the following species:
 Thesprotia brasiliensis (Brazilian grass mantis)
 Thesprotia brevis
 Thesprotia caribea (Caribbean grass mantis)
 Thesprotia filum
 Thesprotia fuscipennis
 Thesprotia gigas
 Thesprotia graminis (American grass mantis)
 Thesprotia infumata
 Thesprotia insolita
 Thesprotia macilenta
 Thesprotia maculata
 Thesprotia pellucida
 Thesprotia simplex
 Thesprotia subhyalina

See also
 Grass mantis
 List of mantis genera and species

References

 
Insects of South America
Mantodea of North America
Thespidae
Mantodea genera